Noordelijk Scheepvaartmuseum (Northern Maritime Museum) is a maritime museum in Groningen in the Netherlands.

The museum was opened on 31 March 1932. With 34,098 visitors in 2015, it is one of the most-visited museums in the province of Groningen. The museum had 38,757 visitors in 2017.

Jan Wiebe van Veen is the director of the museum and Wicher Kerkmeijer the curator.

References

External links 
 
  , official website

1932 establishments in the Netherlands
Buildings and structures in Groningen (city)
Transport in Groningen (city)
Maritime museums in the Netherlands
Museums established in 1932
Museums in Groningen (province)
20th-century architecture in the Netherlands